KakaoStyle (Hangul: 카카오스타일) is a mobile application that curates fashion content from various places. KakaoTalk users are able to check various fashion trends with app and see what their friends are also interested in. The app can even give suggestions and options to purchase the clothing.

References

External links
Official website

Kakao